Frederick William Smith (31 March 1861 – 17 April 1914) was a South African cricketer who played in three Test matches from 1889 to 1896.

Fred Smith was the second child and eldest son of the six children of John and Primrose Smith, who were farmers. In 1871 the family moved to Bloemfontein, where John worked as a clerk. Fred married Maria Campbell in May 1888.

Smith captained both Kimberley and Transvaal and was instrumental in the formation of the Transvaal Cricket Union. He also won many trophies as a sprinter. He was a quick-scoring batsman and a wicket-keeper, as well as an occasional bowler. He was a successful batsman for Kimberley in minor cricket in the late 1880s, and was selected to play in South Africa's first Test, against England in 1888–89.

References

External links

1861 births
1914 deaths
South Africa Test cricketers
South African cricketers
Gauteng cricketers
Wicket-keepers
People from Uitenhage
Cricketers from the Eastern Cape